Arthur Lawrence Norberg (born 1938; died August 9, 2021) was an American historian of science and technology who had been Professor Emeritus at the University of Minnesota since 2005. Previously, he held the ERA Land-Grant Chair in History of Technology at the University of Minnesota, where he was a Professor of Computer Science and Director of the Charles Babbage Institute. Much of his research is on the history of computing. In June 2006, to commemorate Norberg's retirement as director of the Charles Babbage Institute, a symposium was held at the Institute in his honor; some of the papers presented there were later published in a special issue of the IEEE Annals of the History of Computing.

References

External links
Faculty page

American historians of science
1938 births
2021 deaths
Historians of technology
Providence College alumni
University of Vermont alumni
University of Wisconsin–Madison alumni
University of Minnesota faculty
American computer scientists